Evgenios Kitsas (born 12 August 1982) is a professional footballer.

Career
Kitsas has spent most of his career in the lower leagues of Greek football.  He signed with Panetolikos F.C. in the summer of 2012, after spending two weeks with the team on trial.  However, he was released on 7 January 2013, after having made only one appearance for the club

References

External links 
Profile at myplayer.gr
Profile at epae.gr

1982 births
Living people
Greek footballers
Egaleo F.C. players
Leonidio F.C. players
Kalamata F.C. players
Acharnaikos F.C. players
Hersonissos F.C. players
Platanias F.C. players
Panetolikos F.C. players
Super League Greece players
Super League Greece 2 players
Association football forwards
Footballers from Alexandreia, Greece